Qila Niazi (Niazi Fort, Qalaye Niazi, Niyāzī Kalā, نیازی کلا) is a village located near kabul Afghanistan.

It was an ancient fortified area belonging to Niazi tribal chieftains who had married into the Barakzai Dynasty and settled in Paktia Province.

Named after its creators the Khans of Niazi, translated into English the name literally meant "Fort of the Niazis". The area originally housed a mud brick fort.  Although Niazis had inhabited the area as far back as 1500 BC it is impossible to determine the date the fort was founded, since available oral evidence is contradictory.

The fort was inhabited until the late 1930s, when the Great Khan Niazi migrated to Pakistan as a result of the political turmoil in Afghanistan, which caused the nation to practically disintegrate into chaos. Today a village inhabited by Niazi tribesmen stands on the grounds of the fort.

See also 
 Niazi
 Barakzai
 Barakzai Dynasty
 List of notable Niazi people
 Gardēz
 Paktia Province

References

 Tribes and Turbulence
 Glossary of the Tribes and Castes of the Punjab and North West Frontier Province
 Niazi's and Awan
 Government of Pakistan Gazetteer

Populated places in Paktia Province